The EC-130H Compass Call is an electronic attack aircraft flown by the United States Air Force. Based on the Lockheed C-130 Hercules, the aircraft is heavily modified to disrupt enemy command and control communications, perform offensive counterinformation operations, and carry out other kinds of electronic attacks. Planned upgrades will add the ability to attack early warning and acquisition radars. Based at Davis-Monthan AFB in Arizona, EC-130Hs can be deployed worldwide at short notice to support U.S. and allied tactical air, surface, and special operations forces.

The EC-130H is one of the three main U.S. electronic warfare aircraft, along with the Boeing EA-18G Growler, and F-16CJ Fighting Falcon, all of which can suppress enemy air defenses while jamming communications, radar, and command-and-control targets.

In September 2017, the Air Force announced that L3 Technologies will serve as the lead systems integrator for a future Compass Call aircraft based on the Gulfstream G550 business jet. The new Compass Call platform has been designated EC-37B.

Design

Crew 
The EC-130H aircraft carries a combat crew of 13 people. Four members handle aircraft flight and navigation (aircraft commander, co-pilot, navigator, and flight engineer), while nine members operate and employ the EA mission equipment permanently integrated into the cargo/mission compartment. The mission crew includes the mission crew commander (electronic warfare officer), weapon system officer (electronic warfare officer), mission crew supervisor (an experienced cryptologic linguist), four analysis operators (linguists), one acquisition operator, and an airborne maintenance technician.

Aircraft 
The EC-130H fleet is composed of a mix of Baseline 1 and 2 aircraft.

The Block 35 Baseline 1 EC-130H provides the Air Force with additional capabilities to jam communication, Early Warning/Acquisition radar, and navigation systems through higher effective radiated power, extended frequency range, and insertion of digital signal processing compared to earlier EC-130Hs.

Baseline 1 aircraft have the flexibility to keep pace with adversary use of emerging technology. It promotes enhanced crew proficiency, maintenance, and sustainment with a common fleet configuration, new operator interface, increased reliability, and better fault detection.

Baseline 2 has several upgrades to ease operator workload and improve effectiveness. Improved external communications allow Compass Call crews to maintain situational awareness and connectivity in dynamic operational and tactical environments. Aircraft communication capabilities are improved with the expansion of satellite communications connectivity compatible with emerging DoD architectures, increased multi-asset coordination nets, and upgraded data-link terminals.

Delivery of Baseline-2 provides the Air Force with the equivalent of a "fifth generation electronic attack capability," providing improved aircraft performance and survivability.

A majority of the improvements found in the EC-130H Compass Call Baseline-2 are classified modifications to the mission system that enhance precision and increase attack capabilities.

Operational history 

The Compass Call had its first flight in 1981, was delivered to the Air Force in 1982, and reached initial operating capability in 1983.

All EC-130H Compass Call aircraft are assigned to Air Combat Command. The EC-130H is operated by the 55th Electronic Combat Group (ECG) consisting of two operational squadrons (41st and 43rd Electronic Combat Squadron (ECS)), a formal training unit (the 42nd ECS), the 755th Operations Support Squadron (OSS), and the 755th Aircraft Maintenance Squadron (AMXS). The 55th ECG is a tenant unit of the 355th Fighter Wing at Davis-Monthan AFB, Arizona. Although located at Davis-Monthan, the group reports to the 55th Wing at Offutt AFB, Nebraska.

Compass Call has been used in Yugoslavia, Haiti, Panama, Iraq, Afghanistan, and elsewhere.

From 2002 to 2015, EC-130Hs participating in Operation Enduring Freedom - Afghanistan and Operation Freedom's Sentinel flew over 40,000 hours during 6,900 combat sorties.

On 15 January 2020, the first EC-130H Compass Call (serial number 73-01587) was retired from active service. The aircraft was the first EC-130H Compass Call delivered to the Air Force in March 1982.

Operators

 United States Air Force

Specifications (EC-130H)

See also

References

External links 

 
 
 
 Military.com: EC-130H Compass Call
 AircraftGuru.com: EC-130H Compass Call

C-130H, E
1980s United States electronic warfare aircraft
Four-engined tractor aircraft
High-wing aircraft
Four-engined turboprop aircraft
EC-130H